PMT  may refer to:

Technology and engineering
Pole-mount transformer
Padmount transformer
Photomultiplier tube, a light detector

Medicine
 Premenstrual tension
 Pacemaker-mediated tachycardia, caused by artificial pacemaker
 Pasteurella multocida toxin

Political parties
 Malian Party of Labour (le Parti malien du travail)
 Mexican Workers' Party (Partido Mexicano de los Trabajadores)

Transport
 PMTair, Cambodian airline, ICAO code
 Polmont railway station, Scotland, National Rail station code
 First Potteries Limited, formerly PMT Ltd, UK bus company
 Pune Municipal Transport, merged into Pune Mahanagar Parivahan Mahamandal Limited, India

Other uses
 Packaging Machinery Technology, a magazine
 Pardon My Take, a comedy sports podcast
 Parent Management Training
 PMT Dance Studio, of New York City, US
 PMT Italia, a paper machinery company
 Professional Music Technology, a UK musical instrument retailer
 Program Map Table in an MPEG transport stream
 Protection motivation theory